Devious may refer to:

 Deviation (disambiguation)
 Devious (novel), the ninth book in The It Girl series by Cecily von Ziegesar
 "Devious" Diesel, a character in the television series Thomas and Friends
 Devious (Doctor Who), an upcoming fan-made Doctor Who story
 Devious (band), a metal band from the Netherlands